Dindica kishidai is a moth of the family Geometridae first described by Hiroshi Inoue in 1986. It is found in Taiwan.

References

Moths described in 1986
Pseudoterpnini